Jenson Railroad Tunnel  is the first and only railroad tunnel in the present state of Oklahoma. It was constructed through Backbone Mountain during 1885-6, by the Fort Smith & Southern Railway (FSSR). and has remained in service until the present. At the time it was built, the tunnel was located in the Choctaw Nation in Indian Territory. Since Oklahoma became a state in 1907, the tunnel site has been part of Le Flore County, Oklahoma. It is now primarily used by the Kansas City Southern Railroad (KCS), and is sometimes referred to as the KCS - Jenson Tunnel.

History

Jenson Tunnel is located on private property northeast of Rock Island and is the only known railroad tunnel in Oklahoma. Now used by the Kansas City Southern, it was built by Frisco Railway in 1885-6. The tunnel was created through Backbone Mountain in what is now Le Flore County, Oklahoma.

One blogger reported that the tunnel was built on the east side of the Arkansas-Indian Territory border, but that a subsequent realignment of the border put it entirely inside the present state of Oklahoma.

Description

The tunnel has various lengths of lining and arching.  of the interior is unlined and has no arching. About  at each end are lined with stone and have a brick arch. . The rest of the length has timber posts and arches.

NRHP listing 
The tunnel was listed on the National Register of Historic Places (NRHP) on May 13, 1976. Reference number is 76001567.

Notes

References

External links
Map Showing Located Line of the Fort Smith Southern Railway, Through Part of Choctaw Nation, Indian Territory, Sugar Loaf County. NARA On-line Public Access.  Retrieved April 2, 2015.

Pre-statehood history of Oklahoma
LeFlore County, Oklahoma
Tunnels completed in 1886
National Register of Historic Places in Le Flore County, Oklahoma
Rail infrastructure in Oklahoma